Ryan Stephenson may refer to:

Ryan Stephenson, Bones character played by David Gallagher
Ryan Stephenson, councillor elected in the 2016 Leeds City Council election

See also
Ryan Stevenson (disambiguation)